Henry Cole (c. 1500 in Godshill, Isle of Wight
– 1579 or 1580 in Fleet Prison) was an English Roman Catholic churchman and academic.

Life
He was educated at Winchester College and New College, Oxford, was admitted a perpetual fellow there (1523), and received the degree of B.C.L. (1525).  He then went to Italy for seven years, residing chiefly at Padua.

During his career he was successively prebendary of Yatminster (1539); rector of Chelmsford (1540); prebendary of Holborn, Sweting (1541) and Wenlakesbarn (1542); warden of New College (1542–51), and rector of Newton Longueville in Buckinghamshire. Created a D.C.L. at Oxford (1540), he resigned his fellowship the same year. At first he conformed to Anglicanism, but afterwards returned to Catholicism about 1547, and eventually resigned all his preferments.

In Mary I of England's reign he became Archdeacon of Ely, a canon of Westminster (1554), vicar-general of Cardinal Pole (1557), and a judge of the archiepiscopal Court of Audience. He was one of the commissioners who restored Cuthbert Tunstall and Edmund Bonner to their bishoprics, and a disputant against Thomas Cranmer, Nicholas Ridley, and Hugh Latimer at Oxford (1554). He preached the sermon on the occasion of Cranmer's burning in 1556, where he had "the job of explaining why a repentant sinner should still be burnt at the stake for heresy".

On 13 July 1554, Cole was appointed as Archdeacon of Ely and Provost of Eton College, a post which he had vacated by 5 July 1559. He  was made dean of St. Paul's in 1556, judge of Prerogative Court circa 1548-58 and dean of the arches in 1557/8.
 
He was a delegate for the visitation of Oxford (1556), and Visitor of All Souls College in 1558, in which year he received the rectory of Wrotham, and was sent to Ireland with a commission for the suppression of heresy there. Cardinal Pole appointed Cole one of his executors.

During Elizabeth's reign he remained true to the Catholic faith and took part in the discussions begun at Westminster in 1559. He was fined 500 marks, then deprived of all his preferments, committed to the Tower of London (20 May 1560), and finally removed to the Fleet prison (10 June), where he remained for nearly twenty years, until his death.

Works
He wrote: 
 Letters to Dr. Starkey and Sir Richard Morison (or Morysin) from Padua, 1530, and Paris, 1537;
 "Disputation with Cranmer, Ridley and Latimer at Oxford", in Foxe's "Acts and Monuments";
 "Sum and effect of his sermon at Oxford when Archbishop Cranmer was burnt", in Foxe's "Acts and Monuments";
 "Answer to the first proposition of the Protestants at the disputation before the Lords at Westminster 1559", in Burnet's "Hist. Reform. Records";
 "Copie of a Sermon at Paule's Crosse 1560" (London, 1560);
 "Letters to John, Bishop of Sarum" (London, 1560);
 "Answers to certain parcels of the Letters of the Bishop of Sarum", in John Jewel's works.

References

Attribution

External links
Illustration from Foxe's Book of Martyrs showing Cole

Year of birth missing
1580 deaths
People educated at Winchester College
Alumni of New College, Oxford
Wardens of New College, Oxford
16th-century scholars
16th-century English Roman Catholic priests
Prisoners in the Tower of London
English people who died in prison custody
Prisoners who died in England and Wales detention
Clergy from the Isle of Wight
Archdeacons of Ely
Inmates of Fleet Prison
Deans of St Paul's
Provosts of Eton College